Brian Gottfried was the defending champion but lost in the quarterfinals to Stan Smith.

Mark Vines won in the final 6–2, 6–4, 6–3 against Pascal Portes.

Seeds
A champion seed is indicated in bold text while text in italics indicates the round in which that seed was eliminated.

  Yannick Noah (semifinals)
  Brian Gottfried (quarterfinals)
  Johan Kriek (second round)
  Harold Solomon (first round)
  Adriano Panatta (first round)
  Stan Smith (semifinals)
  Pascal Portes (final)
  Ilie Năstase (quarterfinals)

Draw

 NB: The Final was the best of 5 sets while all other rounds were the best of 3 sets.

Final

Section 1

Section 2

External links
 1981 Paris Open draw

Singles